Roy Buchanan is a 1972 self-titled album by American guitarist and blues musician Roy Buchanan.  It is his second album and first for Polydor.  AllMusic commented "It is a loose, highly improvised affair that amply demonstrates why the leader is one of the underappreciated giants of rootsy guitar".

Track listing
All songs written by Roy Buchanan except where indicated.
 "Sweet Dreams" (Don Gibson) – 3:32
 "I Am a Lonesome Fugitive" (Casey Anderson, Liz Anderson) – 3:44
 "Cajun" – 1:36
 "John's Blues" – 5:06
 "Haunted House" (Bob Geddins) – 2:44
 "Pete's Blue" – 7:17
 "The Messiah Will Come Again" – 5:55
 "Hey Good Lookin'" (Hank Williams) – 2:15

Personnel
Roy Buchanan – guitar, vocals
Chuck Tilley – vocals
Teddy Irwin – rhythm guitar
Pete Van Allen – bass
Dick Heintze – keyboards
Ned Davis – drums
Technical
Shelly Yakus - engineer

References

1972 albums
Roy Buchanan albums
Polydor Records albums